Boa Esperança is a Brazilian municipality from the state of Minas Gerais.
The municipality is located by the Serra da Boa Esperança, which became celebrated through song that brings its name, compounded by Lamartine Babo and performed by several singers. Across its territory passes Rio Grande, important to the development of the region. The economy of Boa Esperança is based on coffee plantations and tourism.

History

The municipality of Boa Esperança came up with gold rush of the late 19th century. The first settlement was established in 1778, and in 1804 it was called 'Dores do Pântano.  In 1814 started the construction of the Church, and at that time arose the first coffee plantations, which marked a phase of wealth and progress for the parish. In 1866 the parish was elevated by provincial law to the status of village. On 15 November 1868, the seat of local government was built and the village was elevated by Provincial Law No. 1611 to the status of municipality. In 1957–1958, with the construction of the Furnas Dam and subsequently of the Furnas Lake, the town began to grow as a result of tourism.

Geography, climate, and environment

Climate

Rivers
Grande River, Paraná River, and some of their tributaries receive water by the Furnas Dam, which surrounds the city.

Fauna
Boa Esperança is home to several species of birds such as darters, herons, Roadside Hawks, moorhens, lapwings, Jabirs, kingfishers, and grassquits.

Among the mammals in the area there are capybara, brocket deer, monkey, fox, otter, paca, agouti, megabat, skunk, and others.  Some of these species may have migrated from other areas.

Flora
In this area there are forests and araucarias rich in vegetation, including mimosa, cedrus, cinnamomum, sassafras, manilkara bidentata, morus, Hymenaea courbaril, copaiba, Swietenia macrophylla, and Balfourodendron riedelianum. In riparian forests there are croton, inga, and pine.  Scattered trees, shrubs and sub-shrubs present Annona crassiflora, Stryphnodendron adstringens, Stenocalyx dysentericus, Tabebuia ochracea, Kielmeyera coriacea.

Demography

Its population in 2020 was 40,219 inhabitants.

Government and politics

 Mayor: Antonio Carlos Vilela (Workers' Party) (2013–2016)

Economy

Boa Esperança is an agro-pastoral Municipality. It produces grain, rice, garlic, potatoes, beans, maize, sugarcane, cassava, soybean, tomatoes, several species of fruit, and coffee.  Coffee is the main product and it has a good level of production.  It is consumed domestically and exported to other countries. Livestock, domestic pigs, and poultry are some of the oldest economic activities in the area. Trade, the "royalties" paid by Furnas Central Electric, and tourism are among the main activities of the tertiary sector.

Transport

 BR-369 highway
 MG-167

Education

Health

Culture

Sports

Twin cities

References

External links

 (in Portuguese)
 BoaEsperança.com.br (in Portuguese)
 Câmara Municipal de Boa Esperança [Municipality of Boa Esperança] (in Portuguese)
Censo 2010 at IBGE
Hino do município de Boa Esperança [Anthem of Boa Esperança Municipality] (in Portuguese) at Wikisource

Municipalities in Minas Gerais